Joachim Bißmeier (born 22 November 1936 in Bonn, Germany) is a German actor in stage, film and television.

Filmography

External links
 
Divina Agency Vienna 

1936 births
Living people
German male television actors
German male film actors
Actors from Bonn